Constance or Constanza of Aragon may refer to:

Infantas of Aragon: 
 Constance of Aragon, Holy Roman Empress (1179–1222), daughter of Alfonso II of Aragon, married Emeric of Hungary and then, secondly, Frederick II, Holy Roman Emperor
 Constance of Aragon, Lady of Villena (1239–1269), daughter of James I of Aragon, married Juan Manuel, Lord of Villena
 Constance of Aragon, Queen of Majorca (1318–1346), daughter of Alfonso IV of Aragon, married James III of Majorca
 Constance of Aragon, Queen of Sicily (1343–1363), daughter of Peter IV of Aragon, married Frederick III the Simple
 Infantas of Aragon known by other regions: 
 Constance of Sicily, Queen of Cyprus (1304–1344), daughter of Frederick III of Sicily, married first Henry II of Jerusalem, secondly Leo IV of Armenia, and thirdly John of Cyprus
 One queen consort of Aragon: 
 Constance of Sicily, Queen of Aragon, wife of Peter III of Aragon

See also
Constance of Sicily (disambiguation)